RCD Espanyol Femení (Real Club Deportivo Español) is the women's football section of RCD Espanyol and was founded in 1970.

History
RCD Espanyol was one of the pioneering teams in women's football in Spain, playing its first match as early as 1970. The team's first national success came in 1989, when they first reached the national cup's final, losing it against Añorga. They won the competition for the first time in 1996, and successfully defended the title the following year.

2006 was their most successful season to date as they won their first (and for now only) league title and their third Queen's Cup. Thus Espanyol took part in the UEFA Women's Cup the following season.

In the late 2000s to the early 2010s, Espanyol consolidated itself as one of Spain's top teams. It has been most successful in the Copa de la Reina, winning three titles in 2009, 2010, and 2012, tying with Levante UD as the competition's most successful team. In the late 2010s, they consistently finished in the middle/bottom half of the league table and flirted with relegation multiple times.

Espanyol had its worst-ever finish in the league when they ended the 2019–20 season in 16th place, winning none of their 21 matches and losing 16. They avoided relegation to the Reto Iberdrola when the RFEF decided that there would be no relegations for the season due to suspension of the league brought on by the COVID-19 pandemic. The 2020–21 season marked Espanyol's 50th year of existence for their women's team. That season, Espanyol were relegated to the Reto Iberdrola for the first time in their history, finishing 16th out of 18 in the league table. They failed to be promoted back immediately on the final matchday of the 2021–22 season, losing 3–0 to fellow Catalan club Levante Las Planas, who took the title instead.

Competition record

Season to season

Record in UEFA competitions

Titles

Official
 Primera División
 2005–06: 1
 Copa de la Reina
 1995–96, 1996–97, 2005–06, 2008–09, 2009–10, 2011–12: 6
 Copa Catalunya
 2005, 2006, 2007, 2008, 2013: 5

Invitational
 Pyrénées Cup
 2006, 2007: 2

Players

Current squad

See also
 Women's Derbi barceloní

References

External links

 RCD Espanyol Official website 

RCD Espanyol
Women's football clubs in Spain
1970 establishments in Catalonia
Primera División (women) clubs
Football clubs in Barcelona
Segunda Federación (women) clubs
Association football clubs established in 1970
Primera Federación (women) clubs